Donald "Don" Stevens (born 22 September 1963) is a Canadian former alpine skier who competed in the 1988 Winter Olympics.  He was born in Rossland, British Columbia and was a member of the Red Mountain Racers.

Stevens had 2 podium finishes in the 1987–88 FIS World Cup Season, a 2nd place in the Beaver Creek downhill on March 12, 1988, and 3rd place finish in Åre, Sweden. However, the race in Åre was canceled due to strong winds, resulting in a re-run where he finished 9th.

References 

1963 births
Living people
Canadian male alpine skiers
Olympic alpine skiers of Canada
Alpine skiers at the 1988 Winter Olympics